Giovanni's Room Bookstore is a gay bookstore in Philadelphia. It is the oldest gay bookstore in the United States still operating and has been called the "center of gay Philly".  Founded in 1973 in Philadelphia, Giovanni's Room Bookstore is named after James Baldwin's gay novel Giovanni's Room. Philly AIDS Thrift took over the store after the owner retired in 2014 and the bookstore is now called Philly AIDS Thrift at Giovanni's Room, also known as PAT @ Giovanni's Room.

Location
Giovanni's Room Bookstore is located on the corner of 12th and Pine Street in Philadelphia's gayborhood. The main building was built in 1820, and the second building, which became part of the store several years after the store opened, was built in the 1880s. The store was originally located on South Street and changed locations often in its first few years. It has been at 345 South 12th Street since 1979.

History

In 1973 three Gay Activist Alliance (GAA) members, Tom Wilson Weinberg, Dan Sherbo and Bern Boyle, opened Giovanni's Room at 232 South Street. The store was closed shortly afterward due to a homophobic landlord. The store changed hands to lesbian activist Pat Hill in 1974 and then to Ed Hermance and Arleen Oshan in 1976. Hermance and Olshan moved the store first to 1426 Spruce Street and then to its final location on 12th and Pine in 1979. Olshan left the partnership in 1984.

The Pennsylvania Historical and Museum Commission unveiled a marker on Sunday, October 15, 2011, to commemorate the location of Giovanni’s Room, as it is the country's first LGBT bookstore still operating.

In April 2014 the store's owner of 38 years, Ed Hermance, announced his retirement plans and closed the store on May 17, 2014. He soon after made an agreement with Philly AIDS Thrift and they reopened the store as its proprietor that fall.

References

External links
 
 
 Giovanni's Room records at John J. Wilcox, Jr. LGBT Archives, William Way LGBT Community Center

Independent bookstores of the United States
LGBT bookstores
LGBT culture in Philadelphia
Companies based in Philadelphia
Bookstores established in the 20th century
American companies established in 1973
Retail companies established in 1973
1973 establishments in Pennsylvania